Guelmim-Es Semara was one of the sixteen former regions of Morocco from 1997 to 2015. It covered an area of 122,825 km² and had a population of 501,921 (2014 census). The regional capital was Guelmim.

Geography
The southern half of Guelmin-Es Semara formed part of the Western Sahara. The region was bordered to the north by Souss-Massa-Drâa and to the west by Laayoune-Boujdour-Sakia El Hamra, with the Algerian province of Tindouf to the east. Its disputed territory in the Western Sahara bordered the Mauritanian Tiris Zemmour Region. Guelmin-Es Semara had a coastline on the Atlantic Ocean, with the Spanish Canary Islands lying off it. The Draa River, at 1,100 km the longest in Morocco, flowed through the region into the Atlantic Ocean near Tan-Tan.

The region was made up of the following provinces:

 Assa-Zag Province
 Es Smara Province
 Guelmim Province
 Tan-Tan Province
 Tata Province

Municipalities by population (2004 census)

Guelmin, Guelmim Province: 95,599
Tan-Tan, Tan-Tan Province: 60,560
Es Semara, Es Smara Province: 33,910
Tata, Tata Province: 15,192
Bouizakarne, Guelmim Province: 11,982
Assa, Assa-Zag Province: 11,667
Foum Zguid, Tata Province: 9,611
Zag, Assa-Zag Province: 7,751
El Ouatia, Tan-Tan Province: 6,294
Akka, Tata Province: 6,312
Fam El Hisn, Tata Province: 6,183

References

Former regions of Morocco
Geography of Western Sahara
States and territories established in 1997
States and territories disestablished in 2015